Black moon is a name recently (2016)  given to various new moons or absences of them, within a year. It is not a term used in astronomy and there is no single accepted definition of it. Among the meanings ascribed to it are these: a second new moon that appears in the same month; the third new moon in an astronomical season with four new moons; the absence of a new moon in February; or the absence of a full moon in February.

Definitions, frequency, dates

Month with two new moons 
One use of the term is for the occurrence of a second new moon in a calendar month. This is analogous to the by-month definition of a blue moon as the second full moon in a month. February is too short for a second new moon to occur. This event occurs about every 29 months.

The assignment of a calendar date to a new moon, and in which month a second new moon occurs, depends on the time zone. For example, the new moon of 2016-10-01T00:11 UTC occurs on 1 October for Europe, Asia and Oceania, making it the first of two new moons in October. However, for the Americas the date is still 30 September, making this the second new moon of September.

Calculated in UTC, instances of a second new moon in a calendar month between 2010 and 2020 are:

 2011-07-30
 2014-01-30
 2014-03-30
 2016-10-30
 2019-08-30

Season with four new moons 
Another use of the term is for the third new moon in a season that has four new moons. This is analogous to the Farmers' Almanac definition of a blue moon as the third full moon in a season with four full moons. A season lasts about three months and usually has three new moons. This event occurs about every 33 months.

There is no dependency on time zones in this definition as the seasons are tied to the winter solstice. Instances of four new moons in a season are:

 2012-05-20 
 2015-02-18 
 2017-08-21 
 2020-05-22 or 2020-08-19. This depends on the exact definition of the seasons: If northern summer is deemed to begin at the June solstice then the 2020-06-21 new moon occurs in northern summer. If the seasons are defined in quarter tropical years from the December solstice then the 2020-06-21 new moon occurs in northern spring.

Month without full moon 
Another use of the term is for the absence of the full moon from a calendar month. This can occur only in February; it happens about every 19 years. When February is without full moon, then the preceding January or December and the following March or April have two full moons.

As with the case of two new moons in a month, whether a black moon by this definition occurs depends on the time zone. Calculated in UTC, instances of a month without full moon between 1990 and 2040 are:

 February 1999
 February 2018
 February 2037

Month without new moon 
Another use of the term is for the absence of the new moon in a calendar month. This can occur only in February; it happens about every 19 years. When February is without new moon, then the preceding January or December and the following March or April have two new moons.

As with the case of two new moons in a month, whether a black moon by this definition occurs depends on the time zone. Calculated in UTC, instances of a month without new moon between 1990 and 2040 are:
 February 1995
 February 2014

 February 2033

Paganism 
In some aspects of paganism, particularly amongst Wiccans, the black moon is considered to be a special time when any rituals, spells, or other workings are considered to be more powerful and effective. Others believe rituals or workings should not be conducted at these times.

Criticism of terminology
 The term black moon is not formally established in astronomy and is used at best in the popularization of astronomy.
 There is no single definition of the term black moon.
 The new moon itself cannot be observed.
 The lack of a new or full moon in February can only be assigned to the month, not to any particular date; as such, this is also not observable.
 The event of a black moon is an artefact of how the Gregorian calendar or the seasons map onto lunations. There is no physical or geometric difference between a black moon and other instances of a new moon.

See also

References 

Wiccan terminology
Astrology
New moon